Eternium is the third album by Finnish melodic death metal band Diablo.

Track listing
  "Symbol of Eternity" - 3:54
  "Read My Scars" - 3:42
  "Queen of Entity" - 3:51
  "Lovedivided" - 4:26
  "Faceless" - 3:19
  "The Preacher" - 3:14
  "In Flesh" - 3:10
  "Black Swan" - 4:40
  "Omerta" - 3:23
  "Shape Shifters" - 4:13
  "Reptiles" - 5:19

Personnel 
 Rainer Nygård – Vocals, guitar
 Marko Utriainen – Guitar
 Aadolf Virtanen – Bass guitar
 Heikki Malmberg – Drums

2004 albums
Diablo (band) albums